Christian 'Gigi' Rüf (9 October 1981 in Au, Austria) is an Austrian professional snowboarder known for his unique style and creativity. He is most famous for his film segments, having filmed extensively with Absinthe films, Kingpin productions and The Pirates. He was part of the old Burton UNINC crew, but left Burton after the rest of the team was disbanded, and his outerwear sponsors Volcom offered to provide him with pro model board sponsorship as well.  After a long stint with Volcom  as his main sponsor, he has now set up his own snowboard brand called Slash and has announced that Nike will be expanding his boot sponsorship to include outerwear as well.

References

External links
Gigi's Travel Blog
The Burn Units on Burn.com
http://espn.go.com/action/snowboarding/blog?post=4050873
http://www.grindtv.com/athlete/gigi-ruf/biography/
Best Snowboarders of 2009 : #3 Gigi Ruf (Snowboarder Magazine)

Austrian male snowboarders
Living people
1981 births